Ōsaka 5th district (大阪府第17区, Ōsaka-fu daijuunanaku or 大阪17区, Ōsaka-juunanaku) is a single-member electoral district of the House of Representatives, the lower house of the national Diet of Japan. It is located in western Osaka and consists of Kita-ku, Naka-ku and Nishi-ku of Sakai City. As of 2022, 329,205 eligible voters were registered in the district.

The current representative is Nobuyuki Baba, the leader of Ishin, a right-wing populist party.

Before the electoral reform of the 1990s, the area had been part of the five-member Osaka 5th district.

List of representatives

Election results

References

Politics of Osaka Prefecture
Districts of the House of Representatives (Japan)
Sakai, Osaka